Béat Fidèle Antoine Jean Dominique de La Tour-Châtillon de Zurlauben (1720–1799) was a distinguished soldier in the French army and Swiss historian.

Biography
Béat studied at the Collège des Quatre-Nations, and after completing his studies joined his uncle, General Francois Placide Beatus de la Tour-Chatillon Zurlauben, in his regiment as part of the French army. He served well and was eventually promoted to the rank of lieutenant general.

When he left the army he retired to his country house near Zug, where he proceeded to work on a military history of Switzerland.

1720 births
1799 deaths
18th-century Swiss historians
Swiss male writers